Lu Yen-hsun was the defending champion, but lost in the second round against Denis Gremelmayr.Conor Niland won in the final 5–7, 7–6(5), 6–3, against Thiago Alves.

Seeds

Draw

Finals

Top half

Bottom half

References
Main Draw
Qualifying Singles

Israel Open - Singles
Israel Open